Geno Stone (born April 19, 1999) is an American football safety for the Baltimore Ravens of the National Football League (NFL). He played college football at Iowa, and was drafted by the Ravens in the seventh round of the 2020 NFL Draft. Stone also played for the Houston Texans in 2020.

Early life and high school
Stone grew up in New Castle, Pennsylvania and attended New Castle Junior/Senior High School, where he played wide receiver, quarterback, and defensive back on the football team and was also a member of the basketball and track & field teams. He was named first-team All-State as a senior after recording 97 tackles with 13 tackles for loss, three sacks, and 10 interceptions. A 2-star recruit, Stone initially committed to play college football at Kent State over offers from Ball State, Buffalo, Delaware, and Miami (OH), among others, but he flipped his commitment to Iowa after receiving a late offer from the school.

College career
Stone played in all 13 of Iowa's games as a true freshman, appearing mostly on special teams and finishing the season with 17 tackles and one interception. He became a starter during his sophomore year, recording 39 tackles with a forced fumble, three passes broken up and four interceptions, one of which he returned for a touchdown and was named honorable mention All-Big Ten Conference. As a junior, Stone recorded 70 tackles, three tackles for loss, one sack, four passes broken up, three forces fumbles, one interception, and one fumble recovery and was named second-team All-Big Ten. Following the end of the season Stone declared to enter the 2020 NFL Draft, forgoing his final year of NCAA eligibility.

Professional career

Baltimore Ravens
Stone was selected by the Baltimore Ravens with the 219th overall pick in the seventh round of the 2020 NFL Draft. He was waived on October 8, 2020, and re-signed to the practice squad two days later. He was elevated to the active roster on November 9 and November 14 for the team's weeks 9 and 10 games against the Indianapolis Colts and New England Patriots, and reverted to the practice squad after each game. He was promoted to the active roster on November 17, 2020. Stone was placed on the reserve/COVID-19 list by the team on December 2, 2020, and activated on December 21. He was waived again on December 28.

Houston Texans
Stone was claimed off waivers by the Houston Texans on December 29, 2020.

Baltimore Ravens (second stint)

2021 season
On March 23, 2021, Stone signed a one-year deal with the Baltimore Ravens after the Texans did not extend him a qualifying offer. Due to numerous injuries to the Ravens’ defense, Stone saw increased playing time as the season progressed. He would have his first career start in Week 15 in a 30–31 loss to the Green Bay Packers. He recorded his first career interception in a Week 18 13–16 overtime loss to the Pittsburgh Steelers.

On March 9, 2022, the Ravens placed an exclusive-rights free agent tender on Stone.

2022 season
Stone was named the starting free safety for the Ravens Week 6 against the New York Giants after Marcus Williams went on injured reserve for a wrist injury. He had six tackles in the 20–24 loss. He then followed up that performance leading the Ravens in tackles the next week against the Tampa Bay Buccaneers.

References

External links
Iowa Hawkeyes bio

1999 births
Living people
African-American players of American football
People from New Castle, Pennsylvania
Players of American football from Pennsylvania
American football safeties
Iowa Hawkeyes football players
Baltimore Ravens players
Houston Texans players
21st-century African-American sportspeople